Nuwan Chamara (born 29 April 1983) is a Sri Lankan cricketer. He made his first-class debut for Bloomfield Cricket and Athletic Club in the 2015–16 Premier League Tournament on 4 March 2016.

References

External links
 

1983 births
Living people
Sri Lankan cricketers
Bloomfield Cricket and Athletic Club cricketers
Burgher Recreation Club cricketers
Cricketers from Colombo